Loukas Panourgias (4 September 1899  – Athens, 17 January 1981) was a Greek athlete and footballer.

At the age of 12 he went to Athens and a year later he formed an unofficial team called Niki. Soon he found himself in Panathinaikos, that was still then called Panellinios Podosfairikos Omilos (PPO). Also a track and field champion, Panourgias chose football.

He was part of the Olympic team for the 1920 Summer Olympics, but he broke his leg and consequently did not participate in the Olympic Games. However, he overcame his injury and helped Panathinaikos in the following five years.

Panourgias fought for the acquisition of the Stadium of Panathinaikos at Alexandras Avenue. Together with athletes and friends of the team he transformed the area of Perivola to a football field, which was offered to the team by the Municipality of Athens in 1922.

After he retired from football, he made a successful career as a lawyer. He became also president of Panathinaikos A.C. from 1962 to 1966 (one of the most successful in the club's history with titles in many sports), and of the Hellenic Football Federation. He died on 17 January 1981, aged 81.

References

1899 births
1981 deaths
Footballers from Athens
Greek footballers
Panathinaikos F.C. players
Panathinaikos Athletics
Panathinaikos F.C. presidents
People from Livadeia
20th-century Greek lawyers
Association footballers not categorized by position
Greece national football team managers
Footballers from Livadeia
Sportspeople from Livadeia
Athletes from Athens
Lawyers from Athens